Scirpophaga flavidorsalis is a moth in the family Crambidae. It was described by George Hampson in 1919. It is found in Yunnan, China, India, Bhutan, Bangladesh, Thailand, western Malaysia, Java, the Philippines, New Guinea and Australia.

References

Moths described in 1919
Schoenobiinae
Moths of Asia
Moths of Oceania